Hulkbusters is the name of three fictional organizations appearing in American comic books published by Marvel Comics. All three groups exist within Marvel's shared universe known as the Marvel Universe and are so-named for their attempts to battle the Hulk.

Fictional history

The U.S. military's Hulkbusters
The original Hulkbusters were a large joint task force consisting of both U.S. Army and Air Force personnel, whose primary purpose was to capture or if necessary, destroy the Hulk. Their headquarters was the Hulkbuster Base in New Mexico, resembling a peace sign (also known as Gamma Base), after it was damaged by the Hulk, and they were commanded by General "Thunderbolt" Ross, General Ryker and Major Glenn Talbot. Hulkbuster Base was later demolished by the U-Foes. After Bruce Banner, the Hulk's alter-ego, achieved a state in which his normal intelligence and personality remained dominant while in Hulk form, he received a presidential pardon and the Hulkbusters were disbanded.

While this operation was active, Clay Quartermain was the S.H.I.E.L.D. liaison to the Hulkbusters operation.

Gamma Base, located in Death Valley, is dedicated to the capture and curing of the Incredible Hulk.

Originally, Gamma Base was Project Greenskin: Hulkbuster Base and it was the base for the Hulkbusters. The US Government shut it down and it was opened again for Bruce Banner's Project: Hulkbuster. When that group broke up, it was shut down again. Once again it was re-opened for the use of Operation: Zero Tolerance.

Bruce Banner's Hulkbusters
After the Hulk reverted to his bestial personality, he was captured by Doc Samson. Samson persuaded the government to rebuild and finance Gamma Base. There, Samson managed to separate Banner and the Hulk into two distinct beings, although the Hulk was able to escape. Banner was named the leader of this iteration of the Hulkbusters, which first appeared in Incredible Hulk #317, created by John Byrne (Mar 1986).

Members of this group of Hulkbusters included:

 Craig Saunders, Jr. – Demolition expert (later known as Redeemer)
 Carolyn Parmenter – Marine scientist
 Samuel J. La Roquette – Explorer (later known as Rock)
 Armand Martel – Xenobiologist
 Hideko Takata – Geophysics professor

Saunders, Jr. and La Roquette later became Rock and Redeemer, a supervillain team who faced the Hulk on various occasions, after much of Banner's HB team were slain in Hulk's destruction. Rock had an external hide made of deadly minerals which can be used to impale and grow in size. Redeemer had an exoskeletal suit with weapons like repulsor blasters, and rocket fuel. The Leader later recruited them into "New Freehold" along with the Riot Squad, and they haven't been seen since.

S.H.I.E.L.D.'s Hulkbusters
Hulk's exile from Earth by the Illuminati brought forth an unexpected consequence: Hulk's rogues' gallery began running wild. As a result, S.H.I.E.L.D. formed a team called the Hulkbusters to capture these villains and implant them with nanotechnology to nullify their powers. The team was led by Agent Clay Quartermain and members included Agent Cheesecake, Agent Crimson, and She-Hulk.

Other versions

Ultimate Marvel
The Ultimate Marvel version of Hulkbuster teams exist and primarily serve Nick Fury and S.H.I.E.L.D. Hulkbuster units have been used to take down major threats such as the Green Goblin and Venom.

In other media

Television
 The original Hulkbusters appeared in The Incredible Hulk. Similarly to the comics, this version is led by Thunderbolt Ross and S.H.I.E.L.D. agent Gabriel Jones in tracking down Bruce Banner. 
 The original Hulkbusters appear in The Avengers: Earth's Mightiest Heroes.
 S.H.I.E.L.D.'s Hulkbusters appear in the Ultimate Spider-Man episode "The Incredible Spider-Hulk". This version is led by Agent Phil Coulson in tracking down Peter Parker, who Mesmero trapped in the Hulk's body.
 The original Hulkbusters appear in Hulk and the Agents of S.M.A.S.H.. This version serves as a countermeasure for the titular agents of S.M.A.S.H. In the episode "Hulk-Busted", the Leader hijacks the Hulkbusters to attack the agents, but Iron Man distracts the Hulkbusters while a stealth-bot uploads a virus into their armor, defeating several of them allowing the agents of S.M.A.S.H. to fight back. The remaining Hulkbusters combine into one giant Hulkbuster and capture Iron Man in an attempt to use his arc reactor to destroy a nearby city and frame the agents of S.M.A.S.H. However, the Hulk frees Iron Man, who redirects the giant Hulkbuster into a river. In the episode "Homecoming", the Abomination gains a small group of Hulkbusters programmed to obey him following his reinstatement into the U.S. Army. He uses the Hulkbusters to take over the small town of Vista Verde, but the agents of S.M.A.S.H. fight and destroy them.
 The Hulkbusters appear in Avengers Assemble. In the episode "Head to Head", a Mind Stone-empowered MODOK uses Hulkbusters to take control of S.H.I.E.L.D. and harass the Avengers.

Video games
 The Hulkbusters appeared in the 2003 video game Hulk. These versions are depicted as military units controlled by General Ryker.
 The Hulkbusters appear in The Incredible Hulk: Ultimate Destruction. These versions are soldiers who mentally control mechanical armor of varying sizes and capabilities and are used as part of General Ross and Director Emil Blonsky's efforts to capture the Hulk.
 Armored Hulkbusters appear in The Incredible Hulk video game, with two voiced by S. Scott Bullock and Chris Edgerly. These suits are identified as StarkTech models.

Novels
Craig Saunders Jr. and Samuel J. La Laroquette appear in the novelization of the 2008 film The Incredible Hulk, written by Peter David. These versions are members of a military strike team sent to capture the Hulk and also appear unnamed in the film.

References

External links
 

Marvel Comics military personnel
Marvel Comics supervillain teams